The 2007 Categoría Primera A season was the 60th season of Colombia's top-flight football league. Atlético Nacional won both the Apertura and Finalización tournaments.

Campeonato Apertura 
2007-I - Copa Mustang or Torneo Apertura 2007 is the 65th installment of the Mustang Cup. It began on February 4 with the opening match between Independiente Santa Fe and Atlético Junior in Fusagasugá at the Estadio Fernando Mazuera. The Estadio Nemesio Camacho "El Campín" was not used because was going through some repairs and modifications. 18 teams competed against one another and played each weekend until May 12. At that point, the top 8 teams in the league stage advanced to the group stage, each group with 4 teams. From that point on the teams played on a home and away basis, for a total of a six matches each. The winner of both groups at the end advanced to the home-and-away final.

Standings 
Last updated May 12, 2008

Fixtures

Quadrangular Semifinals 
The second phase of the Torneo Apertura 2007 consists in a quadrangular semifinal. This will be disputed by the best eight teams, later distributed in two groups of four teams, divided by odds and evens. The winners of each group will face each other in the Finals to define a champion.

Group A

Group B

Final

Campeonato Finalización 
2007-II - Copa Mustang or Torneo Finalización 2007 was the 63rd installment of the Mustang Cup. It began on July 15, 2007 and ended on December 19, 2007.18 teams compete against one another and played each weekend until November 12. At that point, the top 8 teams in the league stage advanced to the group stage, each group with 4 teams. From that point on the teams play on a home and away basis, for a total of a six matches each. The winner of both groups at the end advance to the home-and-away final.

Standings

Fixtures

Quadrangular Semifinals 

The second phase of the 2007 Final Tournament takes two groups of four teams. It is disputed between the best eight teams in the first phase, later they are distributed in two groups of four by groups being divided by odd and even numbers. The winners of each group will advance to the Finals to define a champion.

Group A 

 R=Classification in second phase; Pts=Points; GP=Games played; W=Win; D=Tied; L=Lost; GF=Goals Favored; GA=Goals Allowed; DIF=Difference

Group B 

 R=Classification in second phase; Pts=Points; GP=Games played; W=Win; D=Tied; L=Lost; GF=Goals Favored; GA=Goals Allowed; DIF=Difference

Final

Relegated and Promoted Team(s)

References

External links 
 Official website of Dimayor

2007
Col
1